Mohammadabad (also Romanized as  Moḩammadābād; formerly, Qal‘eh Now) is a village in Zeberkhan Rural District, Zeberkhan District, Nishapur County, Razavi Khorasan Province, Iran. At the 2006 census, its population was 168, in 49 families.

References 

Populated places in Nishapur County